Persoonia angustiflora is a species of flowering plant in the family Proteaceae and is endemic to the south-west of Western Australia. It is an erect shrub with hairy branches and leaves, linear, more or less cylindrical leaves and yellow or greenish yellow flowers arranged singly or in groups of up to four.

Description
Flowering occurs from September to March.

Taxonomy and naming
Persoonia angustiflora was first formally described in 1870 by George Bentham in Flora Australiensis from specimens collected by James Drummond near the Swan River.

Distribution and habitat
This persoonia grows in heath mallee and woodland between Eneabba, Perth Frank Hann National Park and Maya in the south-west of Western Australia.

Conservation status
Persoonia angustiflora is classified as "not threatened" by the Government of Western Australia Department of Parks and Wildlife.

References

angustiflora
Flora of Western Australia
Plants described in 1870
Taxa named by George Bentham